Dichagyris devota is a moth of the family Noctuidae. It is widespread from Turkmenistan, Afghanistan, north Pakistan, Iran, Armenia, southeast Turkey, Israel, Jordan to the northern parts of Saudi Arabia.

Adults are on wing from February to April in arid areas and from June to October on the Golan Heights. There is one generation per year.

External links
 Noctuinae of Israel

devota
Moths of the Middle East
Moths described in 1884